Primera may refer to

 Nissan Primera, a car
 Primera Air, a former airline
 Primera división (disambiguation), multiple top division football leagues
 Primera, Texas, a town in Cameron County, Texas
 Alí Primera, Venezuelan musician, composer, poet, and political activist
 Spanish Primera, Spain's highest football competition